Wang Wenbin (born April 1971) is a Chinese politician diplomat, the spokesperson of Ministry of Foreign Affairs, deputy director of the Foreign Ministry Information Department, and  member of the Chinese Communist Party. He is the 32nd spokesperson since the position was established in the ministry back in 1983. He served as the Chinese Ambassador to Tunisia from 2018 to 2020, and has worked in Chinese embassies in Mauritius and Senegal.

Biography
Wang was born in Anhui, China in April 1971. He attended Nanjing Jinling High School. In 1989 he entered China Foreign Affairs University, where he majored in French. After graduation, he was assigned to the Ministry of Foreign Affairs. He served in various diplomatic positions including deputy director and director of the Policy Research Office, political counsellor of the Chinese Embassy in the Republic of Mauritius, counsellor of the Department of Policy Planning, and deputy director of the Department of Policy Planning. He was designated by 13th Standing Committee of the National People's Congress in May 2018 to replace Bian Yanhua as Ambassador to Tunisia. On 17 July 2020, he was appointed the spokesperson of the Foreign Ministry, succeeding Geng Shuang.

Official statements 
In February 2021, Wang called the Uyghur genocide the "lie of the century".

In December 2022, Wang said that Beijing supported the "resolute defence of the national anthem’s dignity," in reference to Glory to Hong Kong being highly ranked on Google when searching for the national anthem of Hong Kong.

In February 2023, Wang said that "Since last year alone, US balloons have illegally flown above China more than 10 times without any approval from Chinese authorities."

Personal life
Wang is married and has a daughter.

References

External links

 Wang Wenbin on the Official website of Ministry of Foreign Affairs of the People's Republic of China

1971 births
Living people
People from Tongcheng, Anhui
China Foreign Affairs University alumni
Ambassadors of China to Tunisia
Spokespersons for the Ministry of Foreign Affairs of the People's Republic of China